Boumal is a surname. Notable people with the surname include:

Olivier Boumal (born 1989), Cameroonian footballer
Petrus Boumal (born 1993), Cameroonian footballer

Surnames of African origin